Ngedikes "Olai" Uludong is a Diplomat from the Republic of Palau, currently serving as the Permanent Representative from Palau to the United Nations and the Palau Ambassador to the European Union in the Kingdom of Belgium. Prior to her role as a diplomat, Uludong was Climate Change Advisor in environmental policy and management throughout the Micronesia and Pacific region. She is an active public servant that has coordinated environment and climate change work in the Republic of Palau, Republic of the Marshall Islands, Republic of Nauru, Republic of Maldives, the United Nations Framework Convention on Climate Change (UNFCCC) process, and served as the Lead Negotiator for the United Nations Negotiating Bloc: The Alliance of Small Islands States (AOSIS) in New York City. As the Current Palau's Ambassador to the European Union and Ambassador on Climate Change.

Political career 
Prior to Uludong's work in Climate Change, she served in the United States Army Reserve as a military policewoman in Guam between 1999 and 2003. After her service, she began her work in environmental policy, providing national environmental education and public awareness projects, oversaw the implementation of community projects and provided her expertise to the national congress and the Executive Branch of the Palau National Government (UNFC: the Convention on Biodiversity and the United Nation's Convention to Combat Desertification, the Oil and Gas Legal Framework for Palau in partnership with World Bank, links with other national and international programs and other Enabling Activities such as the European Union Development Fund, Energy Efficiency Action Plan).

From 2011 to 2013, Uludong became an adviser to the Coastal and Land Management Republic of the Marshall Islands Environmental Protection Authority (RMIEPA), and oversaw the land and coast management division and all related environmental management issues that included mainstream climate change infrastructure development in RMI. Meanwhile, in 2012 to 2014, she was also an advisor for the Government of the Republic of Nauru and the Lead Negotiator/Senior Advisor for Climate Change of the Alliance of Small Island States in New York City.

In 2015, Uludong officially became Palau's Ambassador to the EU and on Climate Change as well as Palau's Permanent Representative to the United Nations' Food and Agriculture Organization (FAO), serving as the Vice Chairperson of the Committee on Fisheries (COFI) bureau to FAO.

On February 10, 2017, Uludong was officially appointed as Palau's Ambassador to the United Nations, and she presented her credentials to Secretary-General of the United Nations António Guterres on March 21, 2017.

Education 
Uludong received Bachelor of Science in Criminal Justice at the University of Guam in 2003, and her Post Graduate Diploma on Climate Change/M.Sc in Climate Change from the University of the South Pacific in Marshall Islands and Fiji after.

References 

Year of birth missing (living people)
Living people
Permanent Representatives of Palau to the United Nations
Ambassadors of Palau to the European Union
United States Army reservists
Palauan women diplomats
Women ambassadors
21st-century diplomats
University of Guam alumni
University of the South Pacific alumni